Waterpark College is a secondary school in the city of Waterford, Ireland. The school was established in 1892 on the banks of the River Suir as Waterford's first Classical school, and still provides a secondary education to boys and girls from Waterford City, County and the surrounding area. Its long serving principal, Thomas A. Beecher, held the position from 1990 to 2019 and was replaced by the Deputy Princpal Joe Hagan

History
Waterpark College, Waterford's first Classical school, was founded in 1892 by the Christian Brothers. It followed the model of other Christian Brothers Colleges CBC and PBC in Cork.
In 1986 Waterpark College received its first lay principal, Maurice O'Connor. This was the first time that an Irish Christian Brothers school had a lay principal.
Dr. O'Connor introduced a co-educational sixth year to Waterpark where girls could join the college to repeat Leaving Cert year. The co-educational sixth year was later discontinued due to policy changes.
Additionally, Principal O'Connor introduced a Transition Year programme to the college, which continues to operate. This Transition Year had an exchange with various schools in Spain which continued until 2007. In 2008 the exchange was replaced with an annual Transition Year trip to Madrid.
In 1990 Dr. O'Connor resigned his post as principal in order to work in the oil industry in Saudi Arabia for a period. He later returned to the college to resume his teaching duties as head of sciences until he officially retired in 2008.
The current principal, Thomas A. Beecher, assumed his position in 1990 upon the departure of Dr. O'connor. Before this, Beecher taught Geography and History at the school.
In February 1999 the Foundation stone of the school's extension was laid by then Taoiseach Bertie Ahern, who later officially opened the extension in 2002.
The extension includes nine classrooms, a double length lecture hall, two science labs, a science tutorial room (known as "the demo-room"), a library and a dedicated technology room. Additionally, a computer room and language lab were housed in the old building, with its ground floor being converted into a G.P. room. A modern gym was also built at the south end of the rugby pitch.
The original school and the new extension are connected by a glass link corridor.

Classes

Each year is divided into two classes, L and R. The classes are called so as traditionally first year classes were based in the classrooms to the left (L) and the right (R) of the main entrance of the old building. The boys are assigned to their class based on the results of an entrance exam held in the year prior to the boys admittance. The boys remain in their stream from first year until the classes are split up for Transition Year or 5th Year.
Traditionally L are the top stream of pupils made up of those with the highest results from the entrance exams. All years except T.Y. are streamed as T.Y. is a limited program (limited to 24 pupils) where numbers don't allow for more than one class.
A class is referred to by a number, representing the year the boy is in and a letter, representing their stream. e.g. third year, top stream is written as 3L.
In the academic year 2006/2007 the classes were renamed where R became A while L become AL (for alpha). In recent years, classes are no longer streamed coming in, but they A and AL designations were kept. Since the year 2012 when the school became co-educational, the class designations changed to .1, .2, and .3 (for example there is three first year classes 1.1, 1.2, 1.3).

Academics
Waterpark College currently offers twelve subjects to Junior Cert. level (Art, Business, C.S.P.E., English, French, Geography, German, History, Irish, Maths, Science, Technology,S.P.H.E, P.E (all rugby) and fourteen subjects at Leaving Cert. level (Accounting, Art, Biology, Chemistry, Economics, English, French, Geography, German, History, Irish, Maths, Physics). Waterpark students are facilitated in the study of outside subjects with Leaving Cert students studying Classical Studies, Applied Math and Music privately. International students are encouraged to sit the Leaving Cert paper in their native language.
Waterpark students have performed consistently well in certificate exams with around 87% of students continuing on to tertiary education placing Waterpark as the top performing boys school in Waterford City and County in the academic years '06, '07 and '08 according to the Irish Times.
Waterpark has consistently produced high achieving debating teams since the 1940s. Waterpark also competes in public speaking, competitive quizzes and frequently send delegates to European Youth Parliament Munster and National conferences. Waterpark College finished third in the 2008/2009 "Know your World" quiz, a national table quiz hosted by Concern.
Waterpark students represent Ireland academically in various fields, providing science and maths olympiads in recent years. The Irish 2008-2010 United World Colleges scholarship was awarded to a Waterpark student.

Rugby
College rugby is tied to the local junior club Waterpark RFC since the club's foundation in 1925 in nearby Ballinakill, Waterford.  The College achieved its greatest rugby accolade to date in 1964 when it reached the Munster A Schools final but was beaten by Presentation Brothers College Cork.

Other sports
The primary sport at Waterpark College is rugby but the College also competes in badminton and track and field athletics. The College hosts an annual Junior Tag Rugby tournament where teams from schools in the city are invited to participate. The College also field teams in GAA and Association football. The school has also recently set up a volleyball club created by the students

Location
The College is situated on the junction of Park road and Newtown road. it lies between the Nineteenth Century Peoples Park and the banks of the river Suir. The colleges name derives from its location, "Water" in reference to the river Suir which banks the school games-field and "Park" in reference to the Peoples Park. Waterpark is located on R683

Associated primary schools

Waterpark National School is the official feeder school for Waterpark College. It formerly existed as Waterpark Junior School, a private, fee-paying, primary school which was originally sited in the main grounds of the college before relocating on the Dunmore road in 1969. The school was once again relocated in the 1980s to the building which was formerly used as a monastery by the Christian Brothers on the grounds of Waterpark College. When Waterpark Junior School closed in May 2001 a new National School was established on the same site. Waterpark National School, under the patronage of the Roman Catholic Bishop of Waterford and Lismore, first opened its doors in September 2001. The school caters for boys and girls and has an enrollment of over 230 pupils. The Waterpark site has now been officially split into two sites, one for the College and the other for the National School. Waterpark National School is situated at the north end of the college rugby grounds.

Notable alumni

Martin Cullen - former TD and Minister.
John Hearne - chief architect of the Constitution of Ireland (1937)
Mario Rosenstock - comedian, political satirist
Father Joseph Patrick Slattery, C.M., physicist, radiologist, Catholic priest, pioneer in the field of radiography in Australia

References

Buildings and structures in Waterford (city)
Education in Waterford (city)
Secondary schools in County Waterford
1892 establishments in Ireland
Educational institutions established in 1892